The Queen Elizabeth Stakes, formerly known as the Queen's Plate, AJC Plate, and  AJC King's Cup, is  is an Australian Turf Club Group 1 Weight for Age thoroughbred horse race run over a distance of 2,000 metres at Randwick Racecourse, Sydney, Australia, in the autumn during the ATC Championships series. Prize money in 2013 was A$500,000 and was increased to A$4,000,000 in 2014 to become the richest race of the Sydney Autumn Carnival and as of 2020 the third richest WFA race in Australia (after the W. S. Cox Plate and the Everest).

History

The origins of this race are firmly associated with colonial Sydney and the growth of thoroughbred racing in the colony during the 1840s and 1850s. The Australian Jockey Club initiated an autumn race meet which coincided with the Easter holiday period and created several races which exist even today. One of these races was the Queen's Plate in honour of Queen Victoria which was first run in 1851 over a distance of about 3 miles.
Through the early 20th century the race continued to hold its prestige, but with the decline in long distance racing, the AJC focused on the Sydney Cup as the premier long distance event of the AJC Autumn Carnival.  By the mid 1950s the race had changed its name and had its distance shortened. Distance was changed several times until today's distance of 2000 metres in 1986.

The ATC focused on the Queen Elizabeth Stakes as it became the  signature event of a new Sydney autumn racing series called "The Championships", attracting international entries.

Name
1851–1872 - Queen's Plate
1873–1927 - AJC Plate
1928 - AJC King's Cup
1929–1933 - AJC Plate
1934 - AJC King's Cup
1935–1954 - AJC Plate
1954 onwards - Queen Elizabeth Stakes

In February 1954, Queen Elizabeth II visited Australia and the Australian Jockey Club consequently named a new race in her honour. She was present at Randwick on 6 February 1954 and witnessed 33/1 long shot Blue Ocean win the race with a track record of 2 minutes  seconds for the  miles race. 

On the last day of the 1954 AJC Autumn Carnival was the last-named race for the AJC Plate, as Lancaster won the Weight for Age 2-mile race. The next year, on the last day of 1955 AJC Autumn Carnival held on 16 April 1955, the fourth race on the card was the Queen Elizabeth Randwick Stakes over a distance of  miles.

Distance

1851–1913 – 3 miles (~4800 metres)
1914 -  miles (~2400 metres)
1915–1922 – 3 miles (~4800 metres)
1923–1927 -  miles (~3600 metres)
1928 -  miles (~2400 metres) (AJC Kings Cup)
1929–1933 -  miles (~3600 metres)
1934 -  miles (~2400 metres) (AJC Kings Cup)
1935–1941 -  miles (~3600 metres)
1944–1946 -  miles (~2800 metres)
1947–1953 -  miles (~3600 metres) 
1954 -  miles (~2400 metres) (Queen Elizabeth Stakes)
1954 – 2 miles (~3200 metres) (AJC Plate)
1955–1969 -  miles  (~2800 metres)
1970–1971 -  miles (~2400 metres)
1972 -  miles (~2800 metres)
1973–1978 – 2400 metres
1979–1983 – 2000 metres
1984–1985 – 2400 metres
1986 onwards - 2000 metres

1934 racebook

1954 racebook

Records
Only Carbine (1889–91), Trafalgar (1909, 1911–12), David (1921–23) and Tulloch (1958, 1960–61) have won the race 3 times. Winx (10-1 on/1-10) as heavy favourite won the race for a third successive time on 13 April 2019.

The 19th century horse trainer Etienne L. de Mestre won the race 9 times, in 1862, 1868, 1870, 1871, 1873, 1874, 1876, 1878 and 1879.

Winners

Queen Elizabeth Stakes 

2022 - Think It Over
2021 - Addeybb
2020 - Addeybb
2019 - Winx
2018 - Winx
2017 - Winx
2016 - Lucia Valentina
2015 - Criterion
 2014 - It's A Dundeel
 2013 - Reliable Man
 2012 - More Joyous
 2011 - My Kingdom of Fife
 2010 - Road To Rock
 2009 - Pompeii Ruler
 2008 - Sarrera
 2007 - Desert War
 2006 - Eremein
 2005 - Grand Armee
 2004 - Grand Armee
 2003 - Lonhro
 2002 - Defier
 2001 - Shogun Lodge
 2000 - Georgie Boy
 1999 - Intergaze
 1998 - Might And Power
 1997 - Intergaze
 1996 - Doriemus
 1995 - Jeune
 1994 - Durbridge
 1993 - Veandercross
 1992 - Rough Habit
 1991 - Stylish Century
 1990 - Sydeston
 1989 - Our Poetic Prince
 1988 - Authaal
 1987 - Dinky Flyer
 1986 - Tristarc
 1985 - Rising Prince
 1984 - Chiamare
 1983 - Fountaincourt
 1982 - Prince Majestic
 1981 - My Blue Denim
 1980 - Iko
 1979 - Shivaree
 1978 - Ming Dynasty
 1977 - Ngawyni
 1976 - Taras Bulba
 1975 - Jandell
 1974 - Battle Heights
 1973 - Apollo Eleven
 1972 - Tails
 1971 - Gay Icarus
 1970 - Panvale
 1969 - Lowland
 1968 - General Command
 1967 - Garcon
 1966 - Prince Grant
 1965 - Fair Patton
 1964 - Summer Regent
 1963 - Burgos
 1962 - Nilarco
 1961 - Tulloch
 1960 - Tulloch
 1959 - Caesar
 1958 - Tulloch
 1957 - Empire Link
 1956 - Beaupa
 1955 - Prince Cortauld
 1954 - Blue Ocean

AJC Plate 
 
 1954 - Lancaster
 1953 - Jan
 1952 - Aristocrat
 1951 - Playboy
 1950 - Hurry Up
 1949 - Carbon Copy
 1948 - Russia
 1947 - Russia
 1946 - Flight
 1945 - Craigie
 1944 - Katanga
 1943 - race not held
 1942 - race not held
 1941 - Beau Vite
 1940 - Mosaic
 1939 - Defaulter
 1938 - Old Rowley
 1937 - Allunga
 1936 - Silver Ring
 1935 - Master Brierly
 1934 - Rogilla
 1933 - Peter Pan
 1932 - Veilmond
 1931 - The Dimmer
 1930 - Phar Lap
 1929 - Strephon
 1928 - Limerick
 1927 - Limerick
 1926 - Windbag
 1925 - Windbag
 1924 - Rapine
 1923 - David
 1922 - David
 1921 - David
 1920 - Poitrel
 1919 - Poitrel
 1918 - Lanius
 1917 - Kandos
 1916 - Greencap
 1915 - Ulva's Isle
 1914 - Cagou
 1913 - Harpist
 1912 - Trafalgar
 1911 - Trafalgar
 1910 - Prince Foote
 1909 - Trafalgar
 1908 - Poseidon
 1907 - Dividend
 1906 - Tartan
 1905 - Emir
 1904 - Lord Cardigan
 1903 - The Victory
 1902 - Wakeful
 1901 - La Carabine
 1900 - La Carabine
 1899 - Merloolas
 1898 - Amberite
 1897 - Newhaven
 1896 - The Harvester
 1895 - Havoc
 1894 - Light Artillery
 1893 - The Admiral
 1892 - La Tosca
 1891 - Carbine
 1890 - Carbine
 1889 - Carbine
 1888 - Abercorn
 1887 - Trident
 1886 - Matchlock
 1885 - Reginald
 1884 - Legrand
 1883 - Plunger
 1882 - The Drummer
 1881 - Progress
 1880 - Caspian
 1879 - Chester
 1878 - Chester
 1877 - Robinson Crusoe
 1876 - Robin Hood
 1875 - Lurline
 1874 - Dagworth

Queen's Plate 
 
 1873 - ‡Dagworth
 1872 - Hamlet
 1871 - Tim Whiffler
 1870 - Tim Whiffler
 1869 - The Barb
 1868 - †Tim Whiffler
 1867 - Fishhook
 1866 - Cossack
 1865 - Canobie
 1864 - Tarragon
 1863 - Tarragon
 1862 - Archer
 1861 - Talleyrand
 1860 - Gratis
 1859 - Strop
 1858 - Zoe
 1857 - Veno
 1856 - Cooramin
 1855 - Vanguard
 1854 - Sportsman
 1853 - Sportsman
 1852 - Cossack
 1851 - Cossack

‡ Dagworth and Reprieve dead heated.  On a second rerun Dagworth was victorious by a short neck.
† The Barb was first past the post but was disqualified for not carrying the correct assigned weight.

See also
 List of Australian Group races
 Group races

References

External links 
Queen Elizabeth Stakes (ATC)

Open middle distance horse races
Group 1 stakes races in Australia
Randwick Racecourse
Breeders' Cup Challenge series